WordBrain is a word game acquired by Swedish game developer MAG Interactive and released through them on July 19, 2015 for iOS, Android and Windows phone platforms.

Gameplay 
The gameplay mechanic is based on finding one or several specific words on a puzzle grid and swiping over the scrambled letters to see words collapse.

The 1980 levels available are grouped in packs of 20, starting with a grid size of 2x2 and reaching 8x8 in the later packs. Players progress in the game by completing packs and unlocking more challenging levels.

Reception 
WordBrain had over 40 million downloads as of 2020.

References

Word games